Nick Bell (born 14 August 1980) is an Australian businessman. He has founded or co-founded several companies in Australia and internationally, including Appscore, Removify, Lisnic, Primal, and First Page Digital. In 2020, Bell’s net worth was estimated by Australian Financial Review 2020 Rich List to be $274 million.

Early life and education

Bell was born in Victoria where he was raised on a farm. He attended Mowbray High School, then went on to Victoria University, Australia. He left and went to London where he worked for several bars, prior to returning to Melbourne to continue his studies. He spent six weeks studying for a business degree before leaving school without graduating.

Career

In 2004, at the age of 24, Bell launched his first business selling skincare products. He later closed the business due to supply chain issues. He started WME, a search marketing firm he launched from his home with $400. His group of companies grew to 1200+ employees and $160 million in revenue by 2019. Bell sold one of his 11 agencies, WME, to Melbourne IT for $39 million in 2017, but he stayed on to expand the company internationally. Outside of WME, Bell has founded or co-founded over 12 companies, including Appscore, Removify, Lisnic, Primal, and First Page Digital.

In 2019, Bell co-founded Removify with Andrew Whitford, a reputation management company that removes unwanted and fake reviews published on websites.

Other companies founded by Bell include Hosting Australia, USEO, SEO Agency, and Results First. He is also an investor in Tribe, Frase.io, Disputify, Vervoe, Cannabis, Ideapod, Lead Chat and Greenfields.

In 2022, Bell appeared as a boardroom advisor for the sixth season of The Celebrity Apprentice Australia.

Personal life

Personal wealth
Bell's net worth was estimated to be $274 million, according to the Financial Review 2020 Rich List.

References

External links
 Nick Bell LinkedIn profile
Nick Bell's Sunshine Coast holiday home 
Nick Bell Interview on LinkedIn Heroes

Australian business executives
Businesspeople from Melbourne
1980 births
Living people